Back in Trouble is a 1997 Luxembourgish comedy film directed by Andy Bausch. The film was selected as the Luxembourgish entry for the Best Foreign Language Film at the 71st Academy Awards, but was not accepted as a nominee.

Cast
 Thierry van Werveke as Johnny Chicago (Jacques Guddebouer)
 Ender Frings as Chuck Moreno
 Oscar Ortega Sánchez as Coco Moreno
 Nicole Max as Jenny Jakoby
 Dietmar Schönherr as Dinkelmann
 Sascha Ley as Juliette Kalmes-Moreno
 Claudine Thill as Camilla Drache
 Fatih Akin as Kebab-Fatih

See also
 List of submissions to the 71st Academy Awards for Best Foreign Language Film
 List of Luxembourgish submissions for the Academy Award for Best Foreign Language Film

References

External links
 

1997 films
1997 comedy films
Luxembourgian comedy films
Luxembourgish-language films